Mehrabad Airport Terminal 1&2 Metro Station is a station in Tehran Metro Line 4's Mehrabad Branch, branching off from Bimeh Metro Station. It is located in Mehrabad Airport serving Terminals 1 and 2.

Terminals 1 and 2 have the following function:

 Terminal 1  is only used for departures of Kish Air and Zagros Airlines.
 Terminal 2 handles all flights of Iran Air, Iran Air Tours, Meraj Airlines, Qeshm Air and Ata Airlines and for arrivals of Kish Airlines and Zagros Airlines, but all the Jet bridges are only being used for Meraj Airlines. It also used for all cargo operations.

Gallery

References

Tehran Metro stations